Khal Adath Jeshurun, Orthodox Jewish congregation in New York
 Yeshiva Rabbi Samson Raphael Hirsch, yeshiva in New York
 Torah Lehranstalt, yeshiva in Germany